This was the eighth season for rugby league's League Cup competition, which was now known as the John Player Trophy for sponsorship reasons.

Widnes won the final against Warrington by the score of 16-4. The match was played at Knowsley Road, St Helens, Merseyside. The attendance was 10,743 and receipts were £11709.

Background 
This season saw no changes in the  entrants, no new members and no withdrawals, the number remaining at eighteen.
Bad weather - Due to an exceptionally inclement (i.e. frost, snow etc.) winter there were very few Rugby League matches played during the months of January and February

Competition and results

Round 1 - First  Round 
Involved  16 matches and 32 Clubs

Round 1 - First  Round - Replays 
Involved  1 match and 2 Clubs

Round 2 - Second  Round
Involved  8 matches and 16 Clubs

Round 2 - Second  Round Replays 
Involved  1 match and 2 Clubs - and due to the first match being postponed because of extremely inclement weather

Round 3 -Quarter Finals 
Involved 4 matches with 8 clubs

Round 4 – Semi-Finals 
Involved 2 matches and 4 Clubs
Bad weather - Due to an exceptionally inclement (i.e. frost, snow etc.) winter there were very few Rugby League matches played during the months of January and February

Round 3 – Semi-Finals - Replays  
Involved 3 matches and 4 clubs - and due to the first match being postponed because of extremely inclement weather

Final

Final - Replay

Teams and scorers 

Scoring - Try = three points - Goal = two points - Drop goal = one point

Prize money 
As part of the sponsorship deal and funds, the  prize money awarded to the competing teams for this season is as follows :-

Note - the  author is unable to trace the award amounts for this season. Can anyone help ?

The road to success 
This tree excludes any preliminary round fixtures

Notes and comments 
1 * Leigh Miners' Welfare are a Junior (amateur) club from Leigh (formed by merger of Astley & Tyldesley and Hope Rangers - and now renamed as Leigh Miners Rangers) 
2 * new record score between professional clubs in the  competition - at the  time, beating the  previous record of 9-51 set when Blackpool Borough lost at home to Leeds by 9-51 in season 1972–73
3 * Milford are a Junior (amateur) club from Leeds
4 * Warrington official archives show the game as being played on 30 September but RUGBYLEAGUEproject and Wigan official archives shows it as played on 24 September 
5 * Postponed due to frozen pitch
6 * Postponed due to frozen pitch - was due to be televised by BBC
7 * Postponed due to the postponement of the Semi Final ties caused by frost and other extremely inclement weather.
8 * The Final had been due to be played on Saturday 27 January but was put back due to backlog of semi-finl ties caused by enforced postponement due to extreme inclement weather
9  * Knowsley Road was the home of St Helens R.F.C. from 1890 until its closure in 2010. The final capacity was 17,500 although the record attendance was 35,695 set on 26 December 1949 for a league game between St Helens and Wigan.

General information for those unfamiliar 
The council of the Rugby Football League voted to introduce a new competition, to be similar to The Football Association and Scottish Football Association's "League Cup". It was to be a similar knock-out structure to, and to be secondary to, the Challenge Cup. As this was being formulated, sports sponsorship was becoming more prevalent and as a result John Player and Sons, a division of Imperial Tobacco Company, became sponsors, and the competition never became widely known as the "League Cup" 
The competition ran from 1971–72 until 1995-96 and was initially intended for the professional clubs plus the two amateur BARLA National Cup finalists. In later seasons the entries were expanded to take in other amateur and French teams. The competition was dropped due to "fixture congestion" when Rugby League became a summer sport
The Rugby League season always (until the onset of "Summer Rugby" in 1996) ran from around August-time through to around May-time and this competition always took place early in the season, in the Autumn, with the final usually taking place in late January 
The competition was variably known, by its sponsorship name, as the Player's No.6 Trophy (1971–1977), the John Player Trophy (1977–1983), the John Player Special Trophy (1983–1989), and the Regal Trophy in 1989.

See also 
1978–79 Northern Rugby Football League season
1978 Lancashire Cup
1978 Yorkshire Cup
John Player Trophy
Rugby league county cups

References

External links
Saints Heritage Society
1896–97 Northern Rugby Football Union season at wigan.rlfans.com 
Hull&Proud Fixtures & Results 1896/1897
Widnes Vikings - One team, one passion Season In Review - 1896-97
The Northern Union at warringtonwolves.org
Huddersfield R L Heritage
Wakefield until I die

1978 in English rugby league
1979 in English rugby league
League Cup (rugby league)